The Mattel World Scrabble Championship 2018 was a Scrabble tournament organised by Mattel and Mindsports Academy (MSA) to determine the world champion in English Scrabble held from 23 to 28 October 2018.

The event was split into two divisions according to players' World English-Language Scrabble Players' Association (WESPA) ratings; the top division comprised some 75 players. 35 games were played on the first four days, after which the top eight proceeded to a 3-game quarterfinals, with the winners advancing to a 5-game semifinals on the same day; the top two players, Nigel Richards and Jesse Day, played a best-of-five final the day after for the top prize of €10,000. Richards beat Day 3–1, becoming world champion for an unprecedented fourth time.

Background

The main event was preceded by a Junior World Scrabble Championship that was won by Pakistani Moiz Ullah Baig. The World Scrabble Championship 2018 took place at the Riveria International Centre in Torquay, Devon, England from 23 to 27 October, with the finals being held at a "clearview cube" in the Westfield Shopping Centre in London a day later, as part of Scrabble's 70th anniversary celebrations. The prize fund for the tournament was £15,500. There were also concurrent events played in five different languages including Catalan, Spanish, French, Norwegian, and German.

Results

Preliminary

After 35 preliminary rounds, the top eight, which included three-time world champion Nigel Richards (2007, 2011, 2013), world champions Brett Smitheram (2016) and Wellington Jighere (2015), and 2014 runner-up Chris Lipe, advanced to the quarter-finals. The defending champion David Eldar was absent, whereas former world champions Craig Beevers (2014), Joel Wapnick (1999), and Mark Nyman (1993) were knocked out of contention.

Source:

Knockout

Source:

Finals

Malaysia-based Nigel Richards, who was born in New Zealand, defeated American data-scientist Jesse Day in the best-of-five finals; Richards had previously won the world championship in 2007, 2011, and 2013, as well as the French world championship in 2013 and 2018. Notable plays by Richards included GROUTIER for 64 points, ZONULAR (100) and PHENOLIC (84), while Day managed a 95-pointer MALEDICT. Richards, who was awarded £6,200, described the championship as "closely-fought", while praising Day for being an "impressive opponent".

References

External links
 

2018
2018 in English sport
2018 in London
October 2018 sports events in the United Kingdom